Clianthus maximus, commonly known as kaka beak (kōwhai ngutu-kākā in Māori), is a woody legume shrub native to New Zealand's North Island. It is one of two species of Clianthus (kaka beak) and both have striking clusters of red flowers which resemble the beak of the kaka, a New Zealand parrot.

The species is endangered in the wild, with only 153 trees found in a 2005 survey (down from over 1000 in 1996), in the East Coast and northern Hawkes Bay regions.

Description 
C. maximus is a small woody shrub which grows to 1.5–6 metres high. It has glossy green leaves and dark scarlet flowers which appear between August and December. These hang in clusters of 15-20 blooms. The stems are a soft wood and are easily broken.

William Colenso described C. maximus in 1885, identifying it as distinct from C. puniceus, the other kaka beak. However Thomas Kirk reduced C. maximus to a variety of C. puniceus (C. puniceus var. maximus) in 1899. Peter Heenan reinstated C. maximus as a separate species in 2000.

In cultivation 
Prior to the 1990s, C. maximus was rarely cultivated, most stock available for cultivation being C. puniceus (then C. puniceus var. puniceus). C. maximus is now widely available in garden shops in New Zealand, however.

References

External links

 Clianthus maximus Colenso (1885), Ngā Tipu o Aotearoa - New Zealand Plant Names Database. Landcare Research, New Zealand.

Galegeae
Trees of New Zealand
Endangered flora of New Zealand
Plants described in 1885
Taxa named by William Colenso